is an action video game that was released exclusively in Japan for the Family Computer. An unofficial English translation patch for the game was released on December 9, 2018.

Gameplay
Sherlock Holmes has to rescue a countess (who is the daughter of an earl) from an evil kidnapper. By travelling all over Great Britain, he can collect the clues and defeat the thugs in order to conduct a thorough investigation.

Parks, sewers and even private houses provide clues needed to solve the mystery and bring the kidnapper to justice. Innocent citizens can also be kicked around just like the criminals. Knives and guns can also be integrated into Holmes' offensive techniques; allowing him to collect money from fallen thugs. If Holmes is killed by any means, the mystery becomes a perfect crime, thus terminating the game.

During the course of the game, players must collect a magnifying glass amongst other tools typically used by Sherlock Holmes. This game features urban violence; particularly in London, which was seen as a "rowdy" city during the late Victorian era. Players can also encounter large groups of violent non-player characters in the "rough streets" of Birmingham. Determining enemy characters from the innocent civilians is not an easy task. The game does not punish the player for firing a loaded weapon in a busy city street during the daytime hours. Famous British landmarks such as the famous Kensington Gardens in London along with Conway Park in Newcastle offer important tidbits that permit the investigation to move forward.

References

1986 video games
Detective video games
Japan-exclusive video games
Nintendo Entertainment System games
Nintendo Entertainment System-only games
Side-scrolling video games
Towa Chiki games
Hakushaku Reijō Yūkai Jiken
Video games developed in Japan
Video games set in the 19th century
Video games set in the United Kingdom